This is a list of schools in the London Borough of Southwark, England.

State-funded schools

Primary schools

Albion Primary School
Alfred Salter Primary School
Angel Oak Academy
Ark Globe Academy
The Belham Primary School
Bellenden Primary School
Bessemer Grange Primary School
Boutcher CE Primary School
Brunswick Park Primary School
Camelot Primary School
The Cathedral School of St Saviour and St Mary Overie
Charles Dickens Primary School
Charlotte Sharman Primary School
Cobourg Primary School
Comber Grove School
Crampton Primary School
Crawford Primary School
Dog Kennel Hill School
Dulwich Hamlet Junior School
Dulwich Village CE Infants' School
Dulwich Wood Primary School
English Martyrs RC Primary School
Friars Primary Foundation School
Galleywall Primary School
Goodrich Community Primary School
Goose Green Primary School
Grange Primary School
Harris Primary Academy East Dulwich
Harris Primary Academy Peckham Park
Harris Primary Free School Peckham
Heber Primary School
Hollydale Primary School
Ilderton Primary School
Ivydale Primary School
John Donne Primary School 
John Keats Primary School 
John Ruskin Primary School
Judith Kerr Primary School
Keyworth Primary School
Lyndhurst Primary School
Michael Faraday School
Oliver Goldsmith Primary School
Peter Hills with St Mary's and St Paul's CE Primary School
Phoenix Primary School
Pilgrim's Way Primary School
Redriff Primary School
Riverside Primary School
Robert Browning Primary School
Rotherhithe Primary school
Rye Oak Primary School
St Anthony's RC Primary School
St Francesca Cabrini Primary School
St Francis RC Primary School
St George's Cathedral RC Primary School
St George's CE Primary School
St James' CE Primary School
St James the Great RC Primary School
St John's and St Clement's CE Primary School
St John's RC Primary School
St Joseph's RC Infant'’ School
St Joseph's RC Junior School
St Joseph's RC Primary School, George Row
St Joseph's RC Primary School, Gomm Road
St Joseph's RC Primary School, The Borough
St Jude's CE Primary School
St Mary Magdalene CE Primary School
St Paul's CE Primary School
St Peter's CE Primary School
Snowsfields Primary School
Southwark Park School
Surrey Square Primary School
Tower Bridge Primary School
Townsend Primary School
Victory Primary School

Secondary schools

Ark All Saints Academy
Ark Globe Academy
Ark Walworth Academy
Bacon's College
The Charter School East Dulwich
The Charter School North Dulwich
City of London Academy, Southwark
Compass School Southwark
Haberdashers' Aske's Borough Academy
Harris Academy Bermondsey
Harris Academy Peckham
Harris Boys' Academy East Dulwich
Harris Girls' Academy East Dulwich
Kingsdale Foundation School
Notre Dame Roman Catholic Girls' School
Sacred Heart Catholic School
St Michael's Catholic College
St Saviour's and St Olave's Church of England School
St Thomas the Apostle College
University Academy of Engineering South Bank

Special and alternative schools

Beormund Primary School
Bethlem and Maudsley Hospital School
Cherry Garden School
Evelina Hospital School
Haymerle School
Highshore School
Newlands Academy
Southwark Inclusive Learning Service
Spa School Bermondsey
Spa School Camberwell
Tuke School

Further education
Lewisham Southwark College

Independent schools

Primary and preparatory schools
Dulwich Prep London
Herne Hill School
London Christian School
The Villa

Senior and all-through schools
Alleyn's School
Dulwich College
James Allen's Girls' School

Special and alternative schools
Arco Academy
Cavendish School
From Boyhood To Manhood Foundation
The Bridge SEN School
PhoenixPlace
Treasure House London CIC

See also

 Southwark Schools' Learning Partnership

Schools
Southwark